Dominick Lynch fitz John, Mayor of Galway, September 1548–September 1549.

Lynch was the son of John Lynch fitz Andrew, and a grandson of Andrew, who had been Mayor for the term 1498–99.

A town statute passed during his term stated that any of the town's enemies seized by gentlemen of the town should be sent to the town to answer for their crimes. If found guilty, sentence was to be carried out by the Mayor and Bailiffs immediately.

Lynch married his kinswoman, Eleanor Lynch, by whom he had six known children: Thomas, John, Nicholas, Stephen, Geoffrey and Henry.

See also

 Mayor of Galway
 The Tribes of Galway

References
History of Galway, James Hardiman, Galway, 1820.
Old Galway, Maureen Donovan O'Sullivan, 1942.
 Henry, William (2002). Role of Honour: The Mayors of Galway City 1485-2001. Galway: Galway City Council.  
 Martyn, Adrian (2016). The Tribes of Galway: 1124-1642

Politicians from County Galway
Mayors of Galway
Year of death unknown
Year of birth unknown
16th-century Irish businesspeople